Florence, Ohio may refer to:

Florence, Madison County, Ohio
Florence Township, Erie County, Ohio
Florence Township, Williams County, Ohio
Munroe Falls, Ohio, which was originally called Florence from ca. 1817-1836

Ohio township disambiguation pages